Giordana Duca (born 18 September 1992 Frascati) is an Italian rugby union player. She plays as a lock for Valsugana. She has 34 caps with the Italy national rugby union team.

Career 
She competed at the 2018 Women's Six Nations Championship, 2021 Rugby World Cup, and 2022 Women's Six Nations Championship.

She played for Frascati and Red & Blu Rugby.  She was called up for the 2018 Six Nations during which she made her national debut in Reggio Emilia against England  and played a total of 4 matches.

The following November, she played in Calvisano against Scotland during test matches at the end of the year, and scored her first international goal.

After a season with Capitolina Rugby team, Duca played in Padua with Valsugana starting from the 2019-20 sports season.

References 

1992 births
Italian rugby union players
Living people
Italian female rugby union players